Hans Trygve Helmer Lütken (born 6 April 1882) was a Norwegian jurist and state auditor.

He was born in Christiania to Harald Lütken and Martha Larsen, and graduated as cand.jur. in 1906. He served as Auditor General from 1926 to 1949.

References

1882 births
Year of death missing
Civil servants from Oslo
Auditors general of Norway